Lindy Casebier (born December 27, 1960) is an American politician who served in the Kentucky House of Representatives from the 29th district from 1987 to 1993 and in the Kentucky Senate from the 7th district from 1993 to 2005.

References

1960 births
Living people
Republican Party members of the Kentucky House of Representatives
Republican Party Kentucky state senators